David Wilfred Maloney (born July 31, 1956) is a Canadian former professional ice hockey defenceman who played eleven seasons in the National Hockey League from 1974–75 until 1984–85.

Playing career
Maloney was drafted 14th overall by the New York Rangers in the 1974 NHL amateur draft. He played 657 career NHL games, scoring 71 goals and 246 assists for 317 points, as well as compiling 1154 penalty minutes. He was also the youngest player to serve as Captain for the New York Rangers and captained them to the 1979 Stanley Cup Finals. That same year, Maloney, along with Phil Esposito and other Ranger teammates, recorded a song called the Hockey Sock Rock as a fundraiser for the Juvenile Diabetes Research Foundation.

On December 6, 1984, the Rangers traded Maloney and Chris Renaud to the Buffalo Sabres in exchange for Steve Patrick and Jim Wiemer.

Maloney played with his brother Don Maloney while with the Rangers.

Post-playing career
In 1990, he called the New York Rangers-Washington series on SportsChannel America along with Rick Peckham. From 1995 to 1998, he was a studio analyst for NHL on Fox.  He currently serves as the colour commentator on Ranger radio broadcasts alongside Don La Greca and Kenny Albert. He currently resides in Greenwich, Connecticut.

In the 2009 book 100 Ranger Greats, the authors ranked Maloney at No. 34 all-time of the 901 New York Rangers who had played during the team's first 82 seasons.

Career statistics

References

External links

1956 births
Living people
Buffalo Sabres players
Canadian ice hockey defencemen
Ice hockey people from Ontario
Sportspeople from Kitchener, Ontario
Kitchener Rangers players
National Hockey League broadcasters
National Hockey League first-round draft picks
New York Rangers draft picks
New York Rangers players
Sportspeople from Kawartha Lakes